Stomp Off is an American jazz record company and label founded in 1980 by Bob Erdos in York, Pennsylvania. The label's first release was Feelin' Devilish by Waldo's Gutbucket Serenaders.

It was described in 1986 as concentrating on "jazz in the styles of the 1920s or earlier, as played by contemporary musicians." Up to then, the recordings were released on LP only. The roster soon covered musicians from the US, Europe, and Japan.

Erdos died on March 25, 2017. By that time, the label had released more than 430 albums, 80 of which were available by digital download.

Roster

 Howard Alden
 Clint Baker
 Aces of Syncopation
 Acker Bilk
 Black Bottom Stompers
 Black Eagle Jazz Band
 Jean-Francois Bonnel
 Tom Brier
 Ernie Carson
 European Classic Jazz Band
 Charquet & Co.
 Chrysanthemum Ragtime Band
 Ken Colyer
 Jim Cullum, Jr./Jim Cullum Jazz Band
 Dave Dallwitz
 Mike Daniels
 James Dapogny
 Ted des Plantes
 Neville Dickie
 Down Home Jazz Band
 Dry Throat Five
 Peter Ecklund
 Wally Fawkes
 George Foley
 Jacques Gauthe
 Banu Gibson
 John Gill
 Grand Dominion Jazz Band
 Marty Grosz
 Hall Brothers Jazz Band
 Heliotrope Ragtime Orchestra
 Art Hodes
 Hot Antic Jazz Band
 Keith Ingham
 Jazz O'Maniacs
 Kustbandet
 Morten Gunnar Larsen
 Carol Leigh
 Louisiana Repertory Jazz Ensemble
 Louisiana Washboard Five
 Humphrey Lyttelton
 Louis Mazetier
 Jimmy Mazzy
 Rosy McHargue
 Turk Murphy
 Don Neely
 New Orleans Ragtime Orchestra
 New Orleans Rascals
 Keith Nichols
 Jimmie Noone Jr.
 Ophelia Ragtime Orchestra
 The Original Salty Dogs Jazz Band
 Paris Washboard
 Bent Persson
 Red Roseland Cornpickers
 Michael Lande's Rhythm Club Orchestra
 Wally Rose
 Scaniazz
 Ray Skjelbred
 Hal Smith
 Ray Smith
 South Frisco Jazz Band
 Andy Stein
 Tom Stuip
 Richard Sudhalter
 Monty Sunshine
 Swedish Jazz Kings
 Butch Thompson
 Uptown Lowdown Jazz Band
 Terry Waldo
 West End Jazz Band
 Golden Eagle Jazz Band-USA
 Gaslight Gale Foehner
 The St. Louis Ragtimers

References

External links
Official site

1980 establishments in Pennsylvania
American record labels
Jazz record labels
Record labels established in 1980